Compton High School is a high school in Compton, California, United States, part of the Compton Unified School District.

History

The school opened in 1896 as Compton Union High School and was later re-established as Compton Senior High School in the 1950s after Compton College separated from the high school district and opened its new campus at 1111 East Artesia Boulevard in 1953.

During the 1960s, there was a dramatic transition from a white student body to one which was predominantly African-American. Contrary to popular belief, Compton High School is hardly a "black" high school today. After the 1992 Los Angeles Riots, many black people left South Los Angeles and moved to the Antelope Valley, the Inland Empire, or the San Joaquin Valley. Today, Compton High School is over eighty percent Latino as Mexican immigrants settled in South Los Angeles.

New Campus
Ground broke on a new high school campus on May 7, 2022 and is expected to open in 2025. Designed by DLR Group, the facility will feature a new performing arts center, academic building, and athletic facilities. New classroom spaces will provide Compton’s 2,500 students the opportunity to participate in programs such as Construction Manufacturing, Graphic Arts, A/V Technology, Communications, Robotics, and Culinary Arts. Additionally, there will be a new football/soccer stadium and outdoor swimming pool.

Dr. Dre donation

On June 15, 2017, Dr. Dre pledged to donate $10 million to the school for a 1200-seat performing arts theater.

Mascot
Compton College's team nick-name is the Tartars, named after the Turkic Tatars, so the team nick-name for Compton High School became the "Tartar Babies". The mascot is "Baby Tartar", who wears a diaper and carries a big sword.

Notable alumni
 Rod Barksdale: NFL wide receiver with Los Angeles Raiders and Dallas Cowboys
 Polly Bergen: movie, television and stage actress, singer, entrepreneur
 Reynaldo Brown: 1968 Olympic High Jumper while still at Compton
 Joe Cain: former NFL player
 Ken Carpenter: 1936 Olympic discus throw gold medal winner
 James Coburn: movie and television actor, Oscar winner
 Robin Cole: former NFL player
 Nadine Conner: opera star
 Aaron Craver: former NFL player
 David Croudip: former NFL player
 Johnny Davis: MLB player
 DeMar DeRozan: NBA player for the Chicago Bulls
 DJ Yella: DJ from the group N.W.A
 Eazy-E: rapper from the group N.W.A
 Jamaa Fanaka: independent filmmaker 
 Marv Fleming: NFL tight end with Green Bay Packers and Miami Dolphins
 Alfonso Freeman: actor
 The Game: rapper
Roddy Ricch: rapper
 William Hanna: animator and co-founder of Hanna-Barbera
 Tim Harris: former NFL player
 Ed Hervey: CFL All-star and general manager
 Roy Jefferson: NFL wide receiver with Pittsburgh Steelers, Baltimore Colts, and Washington Redskins
 Dean Jeffries: car designer and builder, movie stuntman
 Cornelius Johnson: 1936 Olympic high jump champion
 Datone Jones: NFL defensive end with Dallas Cowboys
 Freeman King: Comedian 
 Don Klosterman: professional football player, general manager of LA Rams and other teams
 Jim Marshall: athlete, coach and scout with over 60 years in professional baseball
 Keb' Mo': blues musician and songwriter
 Louie Nelson: NBA player
 Violet Palmer: NBA official
 Walter Roberts: former NFL player
 Pete Rozelle: former NFL commissionerr
 Troy Ruttman: racecar driver
 Hugo Salcedo soccer player and coach
 Woody Sauldsberry: basketball player
 Howard E. Scott: guitarist and co-founder of the funk band War
 Bobby Smith: former NFL player
 Duke Snider: Hall of Fame baseball player
 Iva Toguri: Second World War Japanese propaganda broadcaster
 William Cameron Townsend: Bible translator     
 John William Finn: Congressional Medal of Honor recipient World War II.
 Ulis Williams: 1964 Olympian in track, President of Compton College

References

External links

 Compton High School
 Compton High School Alumni Association
 Compton High School profile provided by greatschools.net
 Compton High School profile provided by schooltree.org

Compton Unified School District
High schools in Los Angeles County, California
Compton, California
 
Public high schools in California
1896 establishments in California
Educational institutions established in 1896